Wallace is an unincorporated community in Kanawha County, West Virginia, United States.

The community most likely was named after a local oil and gas official.

References

Unincorporated communities in Kanawha County, West Virginia
Unincorporated communities in West Virginia